Party Girl is a 1930 American pre-Code crime film directed by Victor Halperin and starring Douglas Fairbanks Jr., Jeanette Loff, and Marie Prevost. It is also known by the alternative title of Dangerous Business, the title of the novel on which it is based. It follows a New York businessman who inadvertently becomes involved in the criminal activities of a covert escort agency.

The film holds the record for the longest transfer from banned status to original release in United Kingdom history, having been rejected for cinema release in 1930, and remaining unreleased there until 2003.

Plot
Maude Lindsay operates the Lindsay Social Bureau, which is a covert front for a "party girl" escort agency that caters to high-class playboys attempting to close business deals. Jay Rountree, the son of a bottle manufacturer, is engaged to marry his secretary, Ellen Powell, a former party girl, whose roommate, Diana Hoster, secretly works as a party girl.

Around Christmas time, Jay and his friends crash one of the girls' parties, where he meets Leeda Cather, the daughter of a formerly-prominent New York family who has gone destitute. A drunken Jay spends the night with Leeda, awaking in her room the next morning, where she exclaims that he "ruined her" the previous night. When Leeda's "mother" confronts the two in bed, Leeda claims she eloped with Jay the night before, a story which he goes along with. Leeda then suggests to Jay that the two marry that afternoon.

When news of their elopement makes the papers, Leeda calls her ex-fiancé Paul Newcast, a businessman who was hesitant to marry her. Happy to be free of the obligation, he gives Jay's father a business contract, as well as sending Leeda $5,000. Jay overhears the conversation and confronts her, but she insists the marriage benefits him and his father's business. At a Christmas Eve dinner at his family's home, Jay tells his father about Leeda's deception, after which she states she pressured Paul into signing the contract, and threatens to implicate Jay and his father in a public scandal.

Meanwhile, Ellen learns of Jay and Leeda's relationship, and is persuaded to attend one of Maude's parties. Police subsequently arrive at Leeda's apartment to investigate the party girl racket, and make a deal with her if she cooperates with the investigation. Leeda attempts to flee via a fire escape, and falls several stories. Jay arrives just before Leeda dies, and she remorsefully instructs him to save Ellen from the party being raided by police. Jay manages to arrive at the party just before the police and explains to them that he and Ellen are not involved in the party girl racket. Maude attempts to convince the police that Ellen is in fact a party girl, but her secretary, Miss Manning, attests that Ellen has never worked for her. After the police depart, Jay proposes to Ellen and she accepts.

Cast

Production
During the production of the film, actor Paul Bern dated Loff, Barrie, and Prevost, the film's three principal female stars.

Release
Party Girl premiered in New York City on New Year's Day 1930, expanding on January 25. Due to its themes surrounding sexuality, the film was banned in some U.S. cities, such as Birmingham, Alabama.

Home media
Alpha Video released Party Girl on DVD on April 25, 2006.

See also
List of banned films

References

Sources

External links

 

1930 films
1930 crime films
American black-and-white films
American crime films
Tiffany Pictures films
Films about prostitution in the United States
Films based on American novels
Films directed by Victor Halperin
Films originally rejected by the British Board of Film Classification
Obscenity controversies in film
1930s English-language films
1930s American films